Martin Ďurinda (also known as Maťo Ďurinda, born 8 November 1961) is the vocalist and guitarist for the Slovak hard rock/heavy metal band Tublatanka. His hometown is Bratislava, Slovakia.

Biography
In his youth, Ďurinda had aspirations of becoming a hockey player while teaching himself to play guitar and piano. Martin learned to sing from his mother, who was a high school music teacher. Between 1977 and 1980, he was a member of the pop group Nervy. In 1982, he enrolled at Comenius University in Bratislava, where he majored in pharmacy. It was there that he met Juraj Černý and Pavol Horváth, and created the band Tublatanka. Together with his band Tublatanka he represented Slovakia at the Eurovision Song Contest 1994 in Dublin with the song "Nekonečná pieseň".
Ďurinda has had a lengthy career with his band Tublatanka and they continue to perform to this day. He has also released a solo album, titled Perfektný svet (Perfect World), which came out in 1997.

Discography

with Tublatanka

Studio albums
 1985: Tublatanka
 1987: Skúsime to cez vesmír
 1988: Žeravé znamenie osudu
 1990: Nebo – peklo – raj
 1992: Volanie divočiny
 1993: Poďme bratia do Betlehema
 1994: Znovuzrodenie
 2001: Pánska jazda
 2005: Patriot
 2006: Vianočný deň
 2010: Svet v ohrození

Compilations
 1994: Neverending Song (six-track rare CD composed of Czech and English mixes of the track "Neverending Song", issued on the occasion of the band's participation in the Eurovision contest)
 1996: Najvačšie hity No.1 - Pravda víťazí
 1998: Najvačšie hity No.2 - Ja sa vrátim!
 2002: Láska útočí (credited as Maťo Ďurinda, Tublatanka)
 2003: Zlatá Tublatanka - 20 rockov
 2006: Gold (credited as Tublatanka, Maťo Ďurinda)
 2012: Najvačšie hity No.3 - Cítim sa fajn

Solo
 1997: Perfektný svet

See also
 The 100 Greatest Slovak Albums of All Time

References

External links

 Tublatanka official website

1961 births
Living people
Slovak musicians
Comenius University alumni
Eurovision Song Contest entrants of 1994
Eurovision Song Contest entrants for Slovakia